James Robinson Love (1836–1914) was an Australian merchant and founder of J. R. Love & Co Ltd and Kinkara Tea.

Love was the son of the politician William Love and Ellinor Robinson, both immigrants from Ireland, and brother of magistrate Milton Love. He resided for many years in "Tivoli", the original residence of Captain William Dumaresq on New South Head Road, Rose Bay, which later became Kambala School. From 1903 he acted as Greek consul in Sydney and consul-general for Greece in New South Wales.

References

1836 births
1914 deaths
19th-century Australian businesspeople